Willi Mehlberg (born 28 February 1937) is an East German sprint canoer, born in Stettin, who competed in the early 1960s. He won the gold medal in the C-2 10000 m event at the 1963 ICF Canoe Sprint World Championships in Jajce.

Mehlberg also competed for the United Team of Germany at the 1960 Summer Olympics in Rome, finishing seventh in the C-2 10000 m event.

References

Sports-reference.com profile

1937 births
Canoeists at the 1960 Summer Olympics
German male canoeists
Living people
Olympic canoeists of the United Team of Germany
ICF Canoe Sprint World Championships medalists in Canadian
Sportspeople from Szczecin